Tensfelder Au is a river of Schleswig-Holstein, Germany. It springs north of the village of Blunk and then flows in a northeasterly direction through the town of Tensfeld and Hornsmühlen into the lake Großer Plöner See. After the Schwentine, the Tensfelder Au is the second largest river flowing into the Großer Plöner See.

See also
List of rivers of Schleswig-Holstein

Rivers of Schleswig-Holstein
1Tensfelder Au
Rivers of Germany